Ice2sea was a program of scientific research funded by the European Union's Framework 7 Programme to study the effects of climate change on glaciation and the melting of ice caps and glaciers on sea level. The ice2sea project, a collaborative of 24 research institutions, which was headed by Prof David Vaughan, aimed to reduce the uncertainty in sea-level projections which are of great economic and social importance to European, especially as large areas of coastal Europe are below or less than a metre above sea level.

The 2007 fourth Intergovernmental Panel on Climate Change (IPCC) report highlighted ice sheets as the most significant remaining uncertainty in projections of sea-level rise. Understanding about the crucial ice-sheet effects was “too limited to assess their likelihood or provide a best estimate of an upper bound for sea-level rise”.

Improved scientific results from ice2sea fed into the fifth IPCC report (2013) to generate more accurate sea-level rise projections.

See also
 Sea-level rise
 Antarctic ice sheet
 Greenland ice sheet
 Glaciers
 Intergovernmental Panel on Climate Change (IPCC)
 European Union Framework Programme 7
 British Antarctic Survey

External links

References

International climate change organizations